"The Last Mile" is the second single released from glam metal band Cinderella's second album, Long Cold Winter. It peaked at number 36 on the U.S. Billboard Hot 100 single chart in early 1989.

Charts

References

1989 singles
Cinderella (band) songs
1988 songs
Mercury Records singles
Songs written by Tom Keifer